Jacob Muricken is an Indian Catholic prelate and theologian, who is the former auxiliary bishop of the Syro-Malabar Catholic Eparchy of Palai. He was ordained as a priest by Joseph Pallikaparampil on 27 December 1993. He served as an assistant vicar, boarding house rector, professor, secretary of Corporate Educational Agency, vicar at Chakkampuzha and Neeloor parishes. He was declared auxiliary bishop of Palai on 24 August 2012 while serving as the diocesan pastoral coordinator. His episcopal ordination was on 1 October 2012 by Joseph Perumthottam at St. Thomas Cathedral, Palai.

In August 2022, Muricken said that "God inspires me to go into solitude" and resigned from his post as auxiliary bishop to continue his life as a hermit, moving to the hermitage following approval from the Syro-Malabar synod.

Early life and career 
Jacob Muricken was born at Muttuchira village in Kerala. After his collegiate studies at Deva Matha College, Kuravilangad from where he took a master's degree in economics, he joined Good Shepherd Minor Seminary, Palai. He did his ecclesiastical studies from St. Thomas Apostolic Seminary, Kottayam. He was ordained priest by then Bishop Mar Joseph Pallikaparampil on 27 December 1993 at his home parish Muttuchira. After a short period of service as assistant vicar at St. Mary's Forane Church Kuravilangad, he was appointed rector of Savio Home Boarding House, attached to St. Joseph's EMHS, Neeloor. Later he served the diocese in various capacities as professor at the diocesan minor seminary, secretary of Corporate Educational Agency, vicar at Chakkampuzha and Neeloor parishes.

Pastoral ministry 
He was declared auxiliary bishop of Diocese of Palai on 24 August 2012 while serving as the pastoral coordinator of the diocese. His episcopal ordination was on 1 October 2012 by Joseph Perumthottam at St. Thomas Cathedral, Palai.

On 19 September 2013, he along with the other newly appointed bishops from around the world, was received in audience by Pope Francis at the Vatican. As the general convenor, he was instrumental in the successful conduct of the 31st Plenary Assembly of Catholic Bishop's Conference of India (CBCI) which was hosted by the eparchy from 5 to 12 February 2014. At present he is serving as the chairman of KCBC Commission for SC/ST/BC. He attended ad limina visit from 2 to 10 October 2019, along with Kallarangatt. He is also the manager of St. Thomas College, Palai, Alphonsa College, Palai and St. Thomas Teacher Training College, Palai.

Living as a hermit 
In August 2022, The Synod of Syro-Malabar Bishops approved Muricken's request to relieve himself from his post as auxiliary bishop of Palai to live his life as a hermit and still remain his title as a Bishop.

Services 
Muricken donated his kidney to a youth who had a kidney malfunction.

In 2020, he launched an online campaign – Justice for M3 (Maira, Minor, Minority) –— to "collectively take a stand against, and strongly condemn, the contemporary scenario of interminable discrimination against minorities, women, and specifically children around the globe." His campaign was focused on severe injustice towards women in Pakistan.

References 

Syro-Malabar bishops
People from Pala, Kerala
Christian clergy from Kottayam
Year of birth missing (living people)
Living people